A relative record data set (RRDS) is a type of data set organization used by IBM's VSAM computer data storage system.  Records are accessed based on their ordinal position in the file (relative record number, RRN). For example, the desired record to be accessed might be the 42nd record in the file out of 999 total.

The concept of RRDS is similar to sequential access method, but it can access with data in random access and dynamic access.

Structure
An RRDS consists of data records in sequence, with the record number indicating the record's logical position in the data set.  A program can access records randomly using this positional number or access records sequentially.  But unlike a Key Sequenced Data Set, an RRDS has no keys, so the program cannot access records by key value.

See also
Key Sequenced Data Set
Entry Sequenced Data Set
Linear Data Set

References
https://web.archive.org/web/20051013071230/http://www.jaymoseley.com/hercules/vstutor/vstutor.htm
http://www.mvsforums.com/techfaqsvsam.html
https://web.archive.org/web/20070311021954/http://www.redbooks.ibm.com/redbooks/SG246105/wwhelp/wwhimpl/js/html/wwhelp.htm

Computer file systems